Joost may refer to:
 Joost, a P2PTV service and software for distributing TV shows online

Places
 Sint Joost - Small village in the Dutch municipality of Echt-Susteren
 Sint-Joost-ten-Node - A Belgian town and municipality in the Brussels district
 Jost Van Dyke - One of the main islands of the British Virgin Islands

People
 Joost (name), a given name and surname